Endy is an unincorporated community in Stanly County, North Carolina, United States.

Notes

Unincorporated communities in Stanly County, North Carolina
Unincorporated communities in North Carolina